Indian Sugar Mills Association is premier sugar organization in India. It establish connection between Government and Sugar industry (private and public) in the country. Prime objective is to ensure that functioning of both private and public sugar mills in country are done through government policies.

The association is the oldest industrial association in India established in 1932. It is industrial association consisting of more than 532 public and private sector sugar mills.  The current ISMA members amount to 50% of total sugar manufactured in India and membership spans across major sugar producing states of India. ISMA typically lobbies with Government of India and local state government for the benefits and interests of sugar manufacturers. India ranks second in production of sugar in world ISMA works closely with Indian Sugar Exim Corporation Limited (ISEC); another association for co-operative sugar mills, and also with All India Sugar Trade Association (AISTA) an organisation representing Indian sugar traders and brokers at international level. ISMA regularly releases statistics regarding sugar output in India.

See also 
 Indian Institute of Sugarcane Research

References 

http://www.indiansugar.com/AboutUs.aspx
https://web.archive.org/web/20130804135905/http://www.isecindia.com/sp.php?p=Home

Trade associations based in India
Indian sugar industry